Dr John Hays McLaren (1846–1943) served as superintendent of the Golden Gate Park in San Francisco, CA for 56 years.

Born at Bannockburn, near Stirling in Scotland, and worked as a dairyman. John also worked in the gardens of Bannockburn House in Banockburn, Stirlilng before going to study horticulture at the Edinburgh Royal Botanical Gardens where he worked as an apprentice gardener's helper. He  planted grasses anchoring the beach dunes along the Firth of Forth then emigrated to the United States in 1870 and worked on the George Howard estate in the San Mateo foothills, then on the Leland Stanford estate in Palo Alto and planted trees on the Coyote Point on the shore of the Bay.

He was friends with John Muir, and dedicated his life to vigorous advocacy and development of the  Golden Gate Park, one of the largest public parks in the world, using considerable political skill in addition to his remarkable gardening skill. Appointed Park Superintendent in 1887, he requested thirty thousand dollars a year for park building. One of John McLaren's stipulations before taking the superintendent job was, "There will be no 'Keep off the Grass' signs." His horticultural philosophy was to achieve a natural look, typified in his dislike for statuary, calling them "stookies" and planting trees and shrubs to hide them. He built two windmills to pump water to his park and had the sweepings from San Francisco streets delivered as fertilizer. When ocean waves and wind piled sand on the west end of the park, he began a forty-year effort to pile branches, clippings and laths on the shore to capture sand and build the great berm that now holds the Great Highway.

He had a shrewd and aggressive style of management but was so highly respected that, at the age of 70, he was given lifetime tenure over the park and his salary doubled. An avenue in the Seacliff District of San Francisco was named after him during his lifetime, and he was awarded an honorary doctorate by the University of California at Berkeley. He is credited with planting two million trees during his lifetime. The McLaren Park in the southern part of San Francisco is named after John McLaren, as is McLaren Lodge in Golden Gate Park, where he lived until his death. East Bay's Tilden Park also has a meadow named after him. A small statue of McLaren was erected in the park which he had hidden away only to be discovered after his death.

After his death at the age of 96, McLaren's body lay in state in the San Francisco City Hall Rotunda. Afterwards, the funeral cortege drove his casket through Golden Gate Park as a special honor.

Lithia Park, Ashland, Oregon 

The small town of Ashland, Oregon commissioned McLaren to design Lithia Park in 1914, just a few years after the park was initially established in 1908. Still considered the "crown jewel" of Ashland, the park covers 100 acres (0.4 km²), extending from the center of town ("The Plaza") up Ashland Creek to the foothills of Mount Ashland. It includes two ponds, a Japanese garden, tennis courts, two public greens, a bandshell (outdoor stage) and miles of hiking trails. The name Lithia comes from the natural mineral water in Ashland, Lithia water. The world-famous Oregon Shakespeare Festival now borders the lower portion of the park. The surrounding watershed, which supplies drinking water and hydroelectricity to the city, also includes miles of mountain biking trails. The park is the start and finish for the annual Spring Thaw mountain biking race for pros and amateurs.

Hanchett Residence Park and Hester Park, San Jose, California 

In 1907 land developer Lewis Hanchett hired John McLaren to design Hanchett Residence Park on the former 76 acre Agricultural Park bounded by Race Street, Park Avenue, the Alameda and Hester Avenue.  John McLaren is credited with creating San Jose's first Residence park that reflected certain architecture standards, sidewalks, street lamps, wide curved streets and gateway landmarks.

San Jose Municipal Rose Garden 
In 1931 John McLaren, designer of San Francisco's Golden Gate Park along with Dr J. Horace McFarland, president of the American Rose Society, and City of San Jose's Planning Director Michael H. Antonacci drew up the original plans for San Jose's Municipal Rose Garden.

Sources
Dickson, Samuel Tales of San Francisco Stanford University Press 1947 LC # 57-9306

References

External links

 Pugsley Silver Medal Biography

American horticulturists
Scottish horticulturists
Golden Gate Park
1846 births
1943 deaths
People from San Francisco
People from Stirling (council area)
Scottish emigrants to the United States
Burials at Cypress Lawn Memorial Park